The Roman Catholic Diocese of Keningau (Lat: Dioecesis Keningauensis) is a diocese of the Latin Church of the  Roman Catholic Church in Malaysia.

History 
Erected in 1992, from the Archdiocese of Kota Kinabalu, on 23 May 2008; the diocese became a suffragan of the newly elevated Archdiocese of Kota Kinabalu. The first bishop is the Right Reverend Datuk Cornelius Piong, appointed on 17 Dec 1992. There are 20 secular and 2 religious priests.

List of Parishes 
There are 10 parishes and 1 Mission located in the Diocese of Keningau.

 St. Francis Xavier's Cathedral Parish, Keningau (69 outstations)
 St. Valentine's Parish, Beaufort (10 outstations)
 St. Peter's Parish, Kuala Penyu (10 outstations)
 St. Patrick's Parish, Membakut, Beaufort (6 outstations)
 St. John the Baptist Parish, Sipitang
 Holy Spirit Parish, Sook, Keningau (47 outstations)
 St. Theresa of Lisieux's Parish, Tondulu, Tambunan (16 outstations)
 Holy Cross Parish, Toboh, Tambunan (20 outstations)
 St. Anthony of Padua's Parish, Tenom (16 outstations)
 Kemabong Mission District, Kemabong, Tenom (15 outstations)

Clergy

Bishop 
Datuk Cornelius Piong, DD. (Rector of KSFX)

Permanently priests  
St. Francis Xavier's Cathedral Parish, Keningau (KSFX)
 Assistant Rector(s): Fr. Joseph Gapitang, Fr. Dr. Charles Chiew, Fr. Bonaventure Unting, Fr. Rudolph Joannes and Fr. David Gasikol

St. Valentine's Parish, Beaufort/St. John the Baptist Church Parish, Sipitang
 Rector: Msgr. Gilbertus J. Engan
 Assistant Rector(s): Fr. Paul Mikin

St. Peter's Parish Bundu, Kuala Penyu
 Rector: Fr. Boniface Kimsin
 Assistant Rector(s): Fr. Lazarus Yuhin

St Patrick's Parish, Membakut, Beaufort
 Rector: Fr. Ronnie Luni

Holy Spirit Parish Sook, Keningau
 Rector: Fr. Claudius Andrew
 Assistant Rector(s): Fr. Harry Dorisoh

St. Theresa of Lisieux's Parish Tondulu, Tambunan
 Rector: Fr. Anthony Mikat
 Assistant Rector(s): Fr. Gilbert Lasius and Fr. Giovani Sugau, CSE

Holy Cross Parish Toboh, Tambunan
 Rector: Fr. Bede Anthonius
 Assistant Rector(s): Fr. Roney Mailap

St. Anthony of Padua's Parish/Mission District Kemabong, Tenom
 Rector: Fr. David Mamat
 Assistant Rector(s): Fr. Benedict Daulis Runsab

Priests Outstationed/On Study Leave 
 Fr. Valentine Gompuk, OFM Cap (Ulu Tiram, Johor Bahru, Johor)
 Fr. Francis Dakun (St. Peter's College Major Seminary, Kuching, Sarawak)
 Fr. Clement Abel Anggas (Philippines)

See also
 Catholic Church in Malaysia
 List of Roman Catholic dioceses in Malaysia

Keningau
Keningau
Keningau